Jonathan Caleb McReynolds (born September 17, 1989) is a Grammy-winning American gospel musician. He began his music career in 2012 with the release of Life Music via Entertainment One Music. He has had two No. 1 Billboard Gospel Albums since with Life Music: Stage Two (2015) and Make Room (2018), fifteen Stellar Awards, four GMA Dove Awards and five Grammy Award nominations in addition to his win in 2021.

Early life
McReynolds was born in Chicago, Illinois, on September 17, 1989, as Jonathan Caleb McReynolds. He was raised by a single mother with love and support from his family, church members and his pastor at New Original Church of God in Christ. Known to be a very precocious kid, he learned to play the drums at five years old, the piano at eight, and showcased his talents weekly as a church musician. He was a reluctant singer, to say the least. However, in high school, he began to break out of his shell; eventually, sharing his talents with the public rather than singing alone in his living room.

He attended Whitney Young Magnet High School, where not only did he become known for his musical talents, but also learned how to record and produce music, as a member of the school's podcast initiative. Those skills would prove to be significant in college as he recorded his first songs including his first viral hit "No Gray" in his dorm room.

Music career
His music career was started in 2012, with the release of Life Music on September 25, 2012, by Light Records and Entertainment One Music. This was his breakthrough released on the Billboard charts, and it placed at No. 98 on Billboard 200 along with Gospel Albums at No. 3, and at No. 23 on the Independent Albums chart. His song "No Gray" was a viral smash that earned him TV appearances on BET's Celebration of Gospel and fans in India Arie and Nicki Minaj.

McReynolds's second album Life Music: Stage Two was Grammy Award nominated, a Billboard Gospel No. 1 album for four weeks, and a GMA Dove Award winner. It featured Israel Houghton, India.Arie and Chantae Cann and his first top five gospel hit "Gotta Have You." Rating the album five stars for Journal of Gospel Music, Bob Marovich says, "Life Music, Stage Two is the musical manifestation of his honest and spiritually grounded approach to dealing with the vicissitudes of daily life." McReynolds brought on yet another popular R&B talent, Tweet, on his EP Sessions (2016) This unannounced, surprise release reached the #1 on the iTunes Christian chart in one night.

Jonathan's third album Make Room was Jonathan's biggest success yet, earning him eight Stellar Awards and two Grammy Award nominations. It also debuted No. 1 on Billboard Gospel charts. Make Room touted his first No. 1 radio hit "Not Lucky, I'm Loved" and the huge viral smash "Cycles." This album garnered public support from stars of different cultures and genres like Justin Bieber, Kandi Burruss, and millions of listeners around the world. This project gave strong evidence to Kirk Franklin's claim that Jonathan is, in fact, "the future of Gospel Music." In March 2018, he broke major ground for gospel, when his one-hour TV special "Make Room" aired multiple times on TVOne. He was also the first in his genre to form a major partnership with Tidal. If all that was not enough, McReynolds just missed the bestseller list with his book "Make Room: Finding Where Faith Fits" that he released in the fall of 2018.

In June 2019, Jonathan co-starred as a judge with Kirk Franklin, Kelly Price and Erica Campbell, on Season 9 of BET's Sunday Best. In 2020 he released People, an EP with "Moving On," the 2021 Grammy winner for Best Gospel Performance/Song.

Soon after the Grammy win, "Favorite Son" a highly successful BET+ movie was released. His first acting role ever, McReynolds played the lead role alongside Rotimi, Serayah, and Loren Lott.

In August 2021, McReynolds earned his fourth straight Gospel Airplay No. 1 with "Grace."

Personal life
In 2016, McReynolds established Elihu Nation, his non-profit that is geared to "celebrate, promote, and work to create young seekers and models of wisdom." It has organized several events aimed at Christian scholarship and self-help and has awarded at least $30,000 in college scholarships.

Somehow, between touring, recording and TV appearances, Jonathan has taught for five years at his alma mater Columbia College Chicago in the music department. His contribution to society outside of music is important to him. In addition to completing his bachelor's degree in music at Columbia College, he earned a master's degree in Biblical studies from Moody Theological Seminary in 2015.

In 2018, McReynolds was admitted into Mensa, an international society for high IQ individuals and became an honorary member of Alpha Nu Omega, Inc., an international Christian fraternity.

Discography

References

External links
 Official website
 Cross Rhythms article

1989 births
Living people
African-American songwriters
African-American Christians
Grammy Award winners
Musicians from Chicago
Songwriters from Illinois
MNRK Music Group artists
21st-century African-American people
20th-century African-American people